Cariniana legalis is a species of emergent rainforest tree in the Monkeypot family Lecythidaceae. It is found in the Atlantic forest of south-eastern Brazil, where is known as jequitibá-branco or jequitibá-rosa, and possibly found in  Colombia, and  Venezuela. These trees can be very large.

One of the biggest trees in the Atlantic Forest, there are some old trees in Santa Rita do Passa Quatro and near Petrópolis. One of these trees is more than 3 000 years old.

It is threatened by habitat loss.

References

Gallery

legalis
Flora of Brazil
Vulnerable plants
Taxonomy articles created by Polbot